Vitaly Melnikov may refer to:
Vitaly Melnikov (film director) (1928–2022), Russian film director
Vitaly Melnikov (swimmer) (born 1990), Russian swimmer